Vanessa Coffey is an American film producer best known for her work on Rugrats, The Ren & Stimpy Show, Doug and Rocko's Modern Life. Coffey has won two Daytime Emmy Awards and a CableACE Award.

Career

Marvel Animation
Coffey's film career began at Marvel Animation working on television shows including Transformers, G.I. Joe, Muppet Babies and Defenders of the Earth. Coffey later moved to Murakami-Wolf-Swenson where she worked on the development of the television show Teenage Mutant Ninja Turtles.

Nickelodeon and Nicktoons
Coffey says that after leaving Murakami-Wolf-Swenson, she did not want to do animation anymore because everything was either modeled after pre-existing comic strips or a vessel for selling related products. Coffey decided that she wanted to bring back original animation and called Debbie Beece at Nickelodeon. Coffey was told that Nickelodeon could not afford animation at the time, but she could produce a special for them. She produced Nick's Thanksgiving Fest in 1988 as an independent contractor. It was only the second time that the studio had done animation. After the success of the special, Nickelodeon contracted with Coffey to develop Nicktoons with original, creator-driven ideas.

Coffey developed three ideas to fill the 90-minute time slot allocated to Nicktoons – Rugrats, The Ren & Stimpy Show and Doug. All three shows were successful and are credited with beginning Nickelodeon's "golden age of cartoons". Coffey calls the variety of the three shows "a balanced meal" for kids. Between the pilots and series' production, Coffey was hired as Nickelodeon's Vice President of Animation.

Of being able to create original programming for Nicktoons, Coffey says, "I was in the right place at the right time." Arlene Klasky, co-creator of Rugrats, and Jim Jinkins, creator of Doug, credit Coffey for enabling them to get their shows off the ground and into the homes of millions around the world.

Awards and nominations

Filmography

External links

References

American film producers
American animated film producers
American women film producers
Film producers from Tennessee
Nickelodeon executives
Daytime Emmy Award winners
Year of birth missing (living people)
CableACE Award winners
Living people
21st-century American women